Slackia equolifaciens  is an equol-producing bacterium from the genus of Slackia which has been isolated from human faeces from Japan.

References

 

Bacteria described in 2010
Actinomycetota